RING finger protein 115 is a protein, that in humans, is encoded by the RNF115 gene.

References

Further reading

RING finger proteins